is a Japanese manga series written and illustrated by Sōichirō Yamamoto. The series features the daily life of Takagi, who loves to tease her classmate Nishikata, and Nishikata's failed attempts to get back at her. In North America, the manga is licensed by Yen Press.

An anime television series by Shin-Ei Animation aired from January to March 2018. An original video animation (OVA) was released in July 2018. A second season aired from July to September 2019. A third season aired from  January to March 2022, and an animated film premiered in June 2022.

In 2021, Teasing Master Takagi-san won the 66th Shogakukan Manga Award in the shōnen category.

Plot
Middle school students Nishikata and Takagi sit next to each other in class. Takagi enjoys teasing Nishikata with embarrassing pranks and jokes. In response, Nishikata creates plans to get his revenge, but he fails when she identifies his weaknesses and capitalizes on them. In some rare instances where Takagi loses the challenge, Nishikata does not feel like he really won. The setting is based on the town of Tonoshō in the Kagawa Prefecture.

Characters

Takagi likes to pass time by teasing Nishikata; she enjoys his reactions to her pranks. Early in the series, she tells Nishikata that she will reveal a secret: "I like you", but "that was a lie". However, it is revealed that the only part that was a lie was that it was a secret. When asked by her classmates if she and Nishikata are a couple, she denies it.

Nishikata is Takagi's seatmate and the target of her teasing. He is constantly thinking of ways to get back at her, but Takagi always takes advantage of the situation and thwarts his schemes. Nishikata refused to acknowledge that he might like Takagi as more than friends until later on in the series when he realized his feelings for her.

A childish girl with large eyebrows.

Mina and Sanae's friend. She wears glasses. Although she tries to maintain a semblance of maturity as class president, she regularly lets her classmates copy her answers so no one would fail.

Mina's best friend, unruffled and quietly amused by her antics. She, Mina, and Yukari hang out together as a trio. She has short dark hair.

Friend of Nishikata and classmate of both him and Takagi; he and Mano are a couple.

Classmate of Nishikata and Takagi; she and Nakai are a couple. She has short dark hair with small pigtails.

One of Nishikata's close friends along with Kimura. He is a bespectacled boy with buck teeth.

One of Nishikata's friends along with Takao. He is an overweight boy who dislikes running.

Tanabe is Nishikata and Takagi's no-nonsense homeroom teacher.

 
One of Nishikata's friends. He tries to act mature in order to get Houjou to become interested in him.

Houjou is a classmate who is reputed to like mature people.

Sumire is a close friend of Takagi with a distinctive ponytail. She shares with Takagi an enjoyment for long walks.

 Chi is the daughter of Takagi and Nishikata according to the flashforward chapters of the main series. The spinoff series Karakai Jōzu no (Moto) Takagi-san features Chi as a main character. While Chi usually joins her mother in her pranks on her father, she fails to outsmart Takagi herself.

Media

Manga

Teasing Master Takagi-san is written by Sōichirō Yamamoto. The series began serialization in Shogakukan's shōnen manga magazine supplement Monthly Shōnen Sunday Mini on June 12, 2013, and it moved to the main Monthly Shōnen Sunday magazine on July 12, 2016. As of March 2023, it has been collected in nineteen tankōbon volumes. In November 2017, Yen Press announced the acquisition of the manga for an English release in North America.

A spin-off manga series, titled , was serialized in the newspaper Yomiuri Chūkōsei Shimbun from November 7, 2014 to November 2015, and was collected into two tankōbon volumes. It was also adapted within the Karakai Jōzu no Takagi-san adaptation in 2018.

A second spin-off manga series, titled , was serialized in Monthly Shōnen Sunday from July 12, 2017 to April 11, 2020, and was collected into five tankōbon volumes.

A third spin-off, titled , featuring an adult Takagi, now married to Nishikata, and their daughter, Chi, started in MangaONE app on July 15, 2017. It has been collected into eighteen tankōbon volumes.

Anime

An anime television series adaptation was announced in the August 2017 issue of Shogakukan's Monthly Shōnen Sunday magazine. The series was directed by Hiroaki Akagi at Shin-Ei Animation, with scripts written by Michiko Yokote and character designs by Aya Takano. It aired from January 8 to March 26, 2018 on Tokyo MX and other channels.

Crunchyroll simulcasted the series, while Funimation streamed the series with an English dub. The series ran 12 episodes. The opening theme is  performed by Yuiko Ōhara. An OVA episode was bundled with the manga's ninth volume, which was released on July 12, 2018.

On January 10, 2019, it was announced that the series would receive a second season; the staff and cast reprised their respective roles. It aired from July 7 to September 22, 2019 on Tokyo MX and other channels, with episodes being exclusively streamed on Netflix in Japan; a worldwide release on Netflix took place on December 6. The opening theme for the second season is  performed by Yuiko Ōhara.

A third season and an animated film were officially announced in September 2021 after they were first teased with the release of the sixteenth volume of the manga. The third season aired on the Super Animeism block on MBS and TBS, and other networks from January 8 to March 26, 2022. The opening theme is  performed by Yuiko Ōhara. Muse Communication secured the distribution rights for the third season in Southeast Asia. On December 28, 2021, Sentai Filmworks announced it had acquired the rights to the third season and the film for worldwide distribution excluding Asia, and is streaming it on HIDIVE.

The film features returning staff members from the third season of the anime series. It was released in Japan on June 10, 2022.

Game
The mobile game  was released on Android and iOS on June 8, 2022. The game will end its service on March 31, 2023, but Toho Games stated in January 2023 that they intended to release its offline version.

Live-action film
A live-action film adaptation was announced in March 2023, with Rikiya Imaizumi serving as the director.

Reception
By December 2016, the manga had over 1 million copies in print. By February 2018, that number had increased to 4 million copies. As of August 2021, the manga has 10 million copies in print.

The manga was nominated for the 10th Manga Taishō awards in 2017. In 2021, along with Chainsaw Man, Teasing Master Takagi-san won the 66th Shogakukan Manga Award in the shōnen category.

Works cited
 "Ch." and Vol. is shortened form for chapter and volume, referring to a number of the Teasing Master Takagi-san manga.
 "Ep." is shortened form for episode and refers to an episode number of the Teasing Master Takagi-san anime series.

Notes

References

External links
 

Anime series based on manga
Animeism
Crunchyroll anime
Medialink
Muse Communication
Netflix original anime
Romantic comedy anime and manga
School life in anime and manga
Sentai Filmworks
Shin-Ei Animation
Shogakukan manga
Shōnen manga
Slice of life anime and manga
Toho Animation
Tokyo MX original programming
Winners of the Shogakukan Manga Award for shōnen manga
Yen Press titles